Gimi (Labogai) is a Papuan language spoken in Eastern Highlands Province, Papua New Guinea.

Phonology

Gimi has 5 vowels and 12 consonants. The voiceless glottal is simply a glottal stop . The voiced consonant behaves phonologically like a glottal stop, but does not have full closure. Phonetically it is a creaky-voiced glottal approximant .

Vowels

Consonants

Allophony

 occurs word initially only in loanwords.

 becomes  before .

 and  tend to fluctuate with one another word initially.

Syllables

Tone

The final vowel of a word takes either a level or falling tone. The falling tone is written with an acute accent.

Orthography

Gimi uses the Latin script.

References

Kainantu–Goroka languages
Tonal languages
Languages of Eastern Highlands Province